Puntarenas is a canton in the Puntarenas province of Costa Rica. The head city is Puntarenas.

History 
Puntarenas was created on 7 December 1848 by decree 167.

Geography 
Puntarenas has an area of  km² and a mean elevation of  metres.

The canton includes areas on both sides of the Gulf of Nicoya. The southern portion of the Nicoya Peninsula is also in the canton, including the popular tourist areas of Tambor, Montezuma and Malpais.

Districts 
The canton of Puntarenas is subdivided into the following districts:
 Puntarenas
 Pitahaya
 Chomes
 Lepanto
 Paquera
 Manzanillo
 Guacimal
 Barranca
 Isla del Coco
 Cóbano
 Chacarita
 Chira
 Acapulco
 El Roble
 Arancibia

Monte Verde was the ninth district of the canton, on 29 September 2021 it was segregated to become a canton on its own, the Monteverde canton, the twelfth of Puntarenas province and eighty third of the country.

Demographics 

For the 2011 census, Puntarenas had a population of  inhabitants.

Transportation

Road transportation 
The canton is covered by the following road routes:

References 

Cantons of Puntarenas Province
Populated places in Puntarenas Province